The Goodnight Scholars program is an undergraduate scholarship program in the United States funded by a gift from James Goodnight and Ann Goodnight. The mission of the program is to "invest in students from low- and middle-income families in North Carolina studying in STEM or STEM education disciplines."

A total of 100 scholarships are awarded each year to 50 high school and 50 transfer students for undergraduate study in certain STEM disciplines at NC State.

References 

Scholarships in the United States